Joseph Peter Ganim (born October 21, 1959) is an American  Democratic politician, former attorney, and convicted felon who is currently serving as the mayor of Bridgeport, Connecticut. He was elected mayor of the city six times serving from 1991 to 2003, when he resigned after being convicted on federal felony corruption charges.  In 2015, Ganim mounted a successful political comeback after being elected Bridgeport mayor again. Ganim was sworn in as mayor on December 1, 2015. Ganim has twice unsuccessfully sought the Democratic nomination for governor of Connecticut, running in 1994 and 2018.

Ganim was successfully reelected to a consecutive term in 2019, and is currently serving his seventh term as mayor of Bridgeport, Connecticut.

Early life and education
Ganim was born to George W. Ganim Sr. and Josephine Ganim of Easton, Connecticut. Ganim's father was a prominent Bridgeport attorney and Republican Party loyalist who was a lieutenant of local Republican boss Ed Sandula. Ganim, on the other hand, became a Democrat.

Ganim attended the University of Connecticut played football for the Huskies and graduated in 1981 with a Bachelor of Arts and Sciences.  He furthered his education and received a J.D. degree in 1983 from the University of Bridgeport Law School (which later became Quinnipiac University School of Law).

Early political career
In 1988, a young Ganim made his first run for office against Lee Samowitz in the 129th House District, a Connecticut House district in Bridgeport. Ganim lost, but only by about 150 votes.

First mayoralty (1991–2003)
Ganim was elected the 51st mayor of Bridgeport in 1991, receiving 15,768 votes (54%) and defeating incumbent Mayor Mary C. Moran, who received 10,951 votes, and two minor party candidates, who got a combined total of 2,258 additional votes. During his campaign, Ganim accused Moran of making the city "a symbol of urban failure with a bankruptcy filing that drew national headlines."

Ganim was subsequently reelected four times, serving five terms. In 1993, Ganim won reelection in a landslide, defeating Republican Anthony G. Minutolo by a 4–1 margin. In 1995, Ganim defeated Republican challenger George H. Comer, the town chairman, by a 6–1 margin.

First term
At the time Ganim took office, the city's dire financial straits caused it to be the only municipality in Connecticut to have its finances under the control of a state board. The state board had ordered the city to raise its property taxes by 18 percent to close a $16 million budget shortfall for the 1991–92 fiscal year. Ganim also campaigned on a law and order platform, promising to hire a hundred new city police officers to combat crime. One reason why Ganim was elected was because "there were few politicians who wanted the grief of being mayor of Bridgeport for the paltry salary of $52,000 a year, hence there was not a lot of strong opposition with which Ganim had to contend." When Ganim became Bridgeport's fiftieth mayor, he was the youngest person to hold the office in city history.

As mayor, Ganim began to clean up the city's East End, reducing the area's notorious crime rates, and reclaiming real estate from drug gangs. Under Ganim, the city installed street lights and street signs and planted trees and flowers. In 1992, the city removed a pile of construction debris (labeled "Mount Trashmore") that had been illegally dumped by a demolition business.

1994 gubernatorial candidacy

In 1994, three years after becoming mayor, Ganim ran for the Democratic nomination for governor of Connecticut. Ganim withdrew from the race in July 1994, less than a week before the Connecticut Democratic convention, after lagging in the polls, and endorsed John B. Larson, the State Senate president pro tem and the front-runner for the party's nomination.

Subsequent terms (second, third, fourth, fifth)
In 1997, Ganim defeated Republican challenger Joan K. Magnuson by a huge margin. In that election, Ganim's appearances on taxpayer-funded commercials "boosting his city's image" were criticized by his opponents, who believed that the commercials were tools for re-election.

Under Ganim, the City of Bridgeport joined a number of U.S. cities (others included New Orleans, Miami, and Chicago) to file legal actions against the handgun industry, arguing that they were liable for product liability negligence in failing to use technology to make their products safer, leading to handgun violence. Such suits were inspired by successful litigation against the tobacco industry. The City of Bridgeport's suit was filed in Connecticut Superior Court in January 1999; it named Smith & Wesson, 11 other U.S. firearms manufacturers, three handgun trade associations, and a dozen gun dealers in southwestern Connecticut as defendants. Ganim said that the city's action aimed at "creating law with litigation...That's the route that we're going because [the industry has] always very effectively, with big money, lobbied the legislature and kept laws from being passed." The city sought $100 million in damages for the cost of human life lost and the public cost of treating shooting victims; Ganim said that the city would agree to a settlement, "if the companies will agree to improve the design of their handguns to prevent their misuse." The suit was unsuccessful: the court dismissed for lack of standing in December 1999, and the dismissal was unanimously upheld by the state supreme court in 2001.

In 1999, Ganim was one of three American mayors to receive the City Livability Program Award from the United States Conference of Mayors. The award was conferred for Ganim's "Clean and Green program," which addressed urban decay and blight through a beautification campaign which saw the demolition of more than five buildings and the development of twelve new city parks. A cornerstone of the city's redevelopment efforts was the construction of a new baseball park (The Ballpark at Harbor Yard) for a minor league baseball team, the building of a new arena (Webster Bank Arena), and the redevelopment of industrial land on the city's waterfront. Ganim's term also saw the competition of demolition of Father Panik Village—a housing project notorious for drugs and violent crime; the final fifteen buildings were razed in 1993.

Ganim also benefited personally, however, by collecting kickbacks from developers, eventually leading to his prosecution (see below).

Conviction on corruption charges
On March 19, 2003, Ganim was convicted of 16 federal counts: one count each of racketeering, extortion, racketeering conspiracy, and bribery; two counts of bribery conspiracy; eight counts of mail fraud, and two counts of filing a false tax return. Ganim was acquitted on six other counts. Ganim surrendered his law license upon conviction. The charges arose from Ganim's "role in a six-year scheme to shake down city contractors for more than $500,000 in cash, meals, clothing, wine and home renovations." In April 2003, two weeks after being convicted, Ganim resigned from office. He was replaced by councilman John M. Fabrizi.

Ganim faced a possible sentence of up to 126 years, $500,000 in restitution, and $4 million in fines. Federal prosecutors asked for a sentence of ten years and one month, while the defense asked for a sentence of no more than three years and ten months. Testimonials seeking leniency were filed with the court on Ganim's behalf, including one from Cardinal Edward M. Egan of New York. On July 1, 2003, U.S. District Judge Janet Bond Arterton sentenced Ganim to nine years in prison and about $300,000 in fines and restitution, in addition to $175,000 that he had previously stipulated that he owed. Judge Arterton said that Ganim's crimes were "stuff that cynicism is made of" and determined by clear and convincing evidence that Ganim had "lied to the jury when he denied any knowledge of fee-splitting deals and other incriminating evidence." Ganim appealed, and the United States Court of Appeals for the Second Circuit upheld Ganim's convictions in December 2007.

Federal prison sentence
Ganim surrendered in September 2003 and served most of his sentence at FCI Fort Dix in New Jersey. He unsuccessfully petitioned for a transfer to FCI Otisville in New York, to be with his family. In 2009, Ganim was transferred to the FCI McKean prison camp in Pennsylvania. Ganim then served the last seven months of his sentence at a halfway house in Hartford. Ganim's sentence was reduced by a year for participating in a drug-treatment program.

Return to Bridgeport
In July 2010, Ganim was released after serving seven years in prison. After his release, Ganim worked as a legal assistant at his family's law firm in Bridgeport. Ganim and his brother George Ganim Jr. also opened a consulting service, Federal Prison Consultant LLC, which offered other white-collar convicts advice on surviving federal prison terms.

Disbarment and requests for reinstatement
After being released from prison, Ganim also sought restoration of his license to practice law. In 2012, a five-member panel of the State of Connecticut Grievance Committee recommended that Ganim's license be restored. In September 2012, a three-judge panel of Connecticut Superior Court judges rejected the recommendation, writing that: "Allowing an applicant to be readmitted to the practice of law following a conviction on 16 counts of racketeering, conspiracy, extortion, mail fraud, bribery and filing false income tax returns without any apology, expression of remorse, or explanation, and with only a vague acceptance of an unspecified event, simply would set the bar for readmission too low in the state, and we are unwilling to do that." Ganim appealed to the Connecticut Supreme Court in 2014, which unanimously ruled against his effort to have his law license restored. In 2017, Ganim applied to the U.S. District Court for the District of Connecticut for permission to practice in that federal court without being readmitted to the Connecticut bar; these efforts were rebuffed by the court. In 2021, Ganim again sought reinstatement of his license to practice law.

Second mayoralty (2015–present)

2015 mayoral campaign

On January 1, 2015, Ganim offered a public apology to the City of Bridgeport for his corruption scandal, saying: "I'm truly sorry." The apology—as well as visits to churches in city's mainly African-American east side, a former stronghold for Ganim during his days as mayor—fueled speculation about a return to politics for Ganim. In March 2015, Ganim moved back to Bridgeport from Easton, where he had been living.

In May 2015, Ganim officially entered the race for mayor, filing paperwork to challenge incumbent Democrat Bill Finch as mayor of Bridgeport. Ganim won the endorsement of the Bridgeport police union. Ganim also won the key support of local clergy and the Democratic machine led by Democratic Town Committee chairman Mario Testa.

In September 2015, Ganim won the Democratic primary, making "a big step toward completing an improbable political comeback." Ganim defeated two primary opponents: Finch, the incumbent mayor, and University of Bridgeport vice president Mary–Jane Foster, co-founder of the Bridgeport Bluefish minor-league baseball team. Ganim received 6,264 votes, Finch 5,859, and Foster 1,177.

In the days after the primary election, Finch sought to run in the general election under the "Job Creation Party" ballot line, while Foster announced she would not seek to appear on the general-election ballot as a petitioning candidate. However, Finch's campaign missed a filing deadline, and he dropped out of the race; Foster jumped back into the race, receiving Finch's endorsement.

During his campaign, Ganim promised to reduce taxes, lower crime by adding more police officers, and lower unemployment, which is high in Bridgeport. He managed to persuade Edward Adams, a former FBI agent who helped convict Ganim on corruption charges, to support his campaign. However, Michael Wolf, the FBI special agent-in-charge of Connecticut during the Ganim investigation, fired back with a letter published in the Connecticut Post saying that Adams was not the lead investigator in the Ganim case, and writing that "a mayor who swindled a city he was entrusted to govern, should not be given the opportunity to do it again." Wolf called Ganim the "poster boy" of corrupt Connecticut politicians, a group that included former Governor John G. Rowland, former state Treasurer Paul J. Silvester, and former Bridgeport state Senator Ernest Newton II.

On November 3, 2015, Ganim won election as mayor by a wide margin, defeating Mary Jane Foster (a Democrat running as an unaffiliated candidate) and Republican nominee Enrique Torres, a city councilman. Ganim's successful return to politics has been compared to Marion Barry Jr. of Washington and Vincent A. (Buddy) Cianci, Jr. of Providence, Rhode Island, other mayors who won re-election after criminal convictions. The New York Times reported Ganim's election victory as "a stunning return to public office ... remarkable for its sheer audacity, coming after a widely publicized fall from grace."

Sixth term
Ganim was sworn in on December 1, 2015.

2018 gubernatorial candidacy

In 2017, Ganim filed paperwork creating an exploratory committee to run for governor of Connecticut in 2018. Ganim requested public campaign financing, which in Connecticut is available to qualified candidates. In April 2017, however, the Connecticut Elections Enforcement Commission denied his request due to a state law denying public funding to candidates convicted of "felonies related to public office." Ganim challenged the denial in federal court on constitutional grounds, but the U.S. District Court dismissed his suit in November 2017.

In his campaign against Ned Lamont for the nomination, Ganim unsuccessfully ran as "feisty, in-your-face campaign, which he tried to frame as a city-versus-suburban class struggle." In the August 16, 2018, primary election, Ganim was defeated by a wide margin by Lamont, who received 172,088 votes (81.2%) to Ganim's 39,917 votes (18.8%).

Seventh term
Ganim was reelected as mayor in 2019, securing a seventh term as mayor.

FBI corruption investigation
In February 2019, the FBI served a subpoena to Ganim's administration, which was obtained by the Connecticut Post. The subpoena revealed a federal grand jury in New Haven was investigating Ganim's administration for possible municipal corruption. Ganim's administration spent more than $500,000 responding to the criminal probe into Bridgeport, included the fees for private lawyers for multiple government officials including Ganim; the investigation was similar in some respects to FBI's criminal investigation into Ganim's actions as mayor in 2003.

Personal life
In 1993, Ganim (then the 33-year-old mayor of Bridgeport) married Ellen Jennifer White, known as Jennifer. The couple wed at the St. Augustine Cathedral in Bridgeport in a ceremony performed by Bishop Edward M. Egan (later cardinal) of the Roman Catholic Diocese of Bridgeport. They have three children. 

In 2014, the couple divorced. In 2015, a Connecticut Superior Court judge agreed to Ganim's request for a reduction in Ganim's alimony payments he sought on the basis of his low income and lack of business in his consulting job.

References

Sources
 Rob Sullivan, Political Corruption in Bridgeport: Scandal in the Park City (The History Press: 2014)

External links
 Official website

|-

1959 births
1996 United States presidential electors
American gun control activists
American politicians of Lebanese descent
Connecticut Democrats
Connecticut lawyers
Connecticut politicians convicted of crimes
Disbarred American lawyers
Living people
Mayors of Bridgeport, Connecticut
Politicians convicted of extortion under color of official right
Politicians convicted of mail and wire fraud
Politicians convicted of program bribery
Politicians convicted of racketeering
Candidates in the 1994 United States elections